The 2022 Mountain West Conference baseball tournament will take place from May 26 through 29.  The top four of the league's seven teams will meet in the double-elimination tournament to be held at Tony Gwynn Stadium in San Diego, California. The Air Force Falcons won the tournament and earned the Mountain West Conference's automatic bid to the 2022 NCAA Division I baseball tournament. It will be the Falcons' first time representing the Mountain West in the NCAA tournament and their first appearance overall since 1969.

Format and seeding
The conference's top four teams will be seeded based on winning percentage during the round robin regular season schedule.  They will then play a double-elimination tournament with the top seed playing the fourth seeded team and the second seeded team playing the third seed.

Bracket

References

Tournament
Mountain West Conference baseball tournament
Mountain West Conference baseball tournament
Baseball competitions in San Diego
College baseball tournaments in California